Alain Raguel (born 6 September 1976 in Lille) is a former French footballer. He last played for Olympiakos Volou in Greece.

External links

zerozero 
worldsoccerstats
soccerterminal

1976 births
Living people
French footballers
French expatriate footballers
Lille OSC players
ASOA Valence players
Ligue 2 players
Panionios F.C. players
Iraklis Thessaloniki F.C. players
Panathinaikos F.C. players
Atromitos F.C. players
Expatriate footballers in Greece
Footballers from Lille
Olympiacos Volos F.C. players
Super League Greece players
Association football midfielders